Lorenzago di Cadore is a comune (municipality) in the Province of Belluno in the Italian region of Veneto, located about  north of Venice and about  northeast of Belluno.

Lorenzago di Cadore borders the following municipalities: Domegge di Cadore, Forni di Sopra, Lozzo di Cadore, Vigo di Cadore.
For a number of years, Lorenzago hosted the summer vacation of Pope John Paul II. In 2007, Pope Benedict XVI was on vacation there.

Giulio Tremonti, twice Italian Finance Minister, was granted honorary citizenship on 29 December 2009; though born in Sondrio, his father was a native from Lorenzago and here the son hosted the drafters of the centre-right proposal of Constitutional amendment.

Gallery

Demographic evolution

References

External Links
http://www.lorenzago.com

Cities and towns in Veneto